Sumiyoshi Shrine may refer to:
Sumiyoshi taisha, a Shinto shrine in Sumiyoshi ward in Osaka, Japan
Sumiyoshi Shrine (Fukuoka), a Shinto shrine at Hakata in Fukuoka Prefecture on the island of Kyushu